Uristidae is a family of crustaceans belonging to the order Amphipoda.

Genera

Genera:
 Abyssorchomene De Broyer, 1984
 Anonyx Krøyer, 1838
 Caeconyx Barnard & Karaman, 1991

References

Amphipoda